Randolph County Schools or Randolph County School System can refer to:
Randolph County School District (Alabama)
Randolph County School District (Arkansas)
Randolph County School District (Georgia)
Randolph County Schools (North Carolina)
Randolph County Schools (West Virginia)